Talkeetna Depot is a freight and passenger railroad station in Talkeetna, Alaska. The station offers service for the Alaska Railroad's Denali Star and Aurora Winter Train routes.

References

External links
Alaska Railroad home page

Alaska Railroad stations
Buildings and structures in Matanuska-Susitna Borough, Alaska